Festuca brunnescens is a species of grass in the family Poaceae. The species was first published in 1976. This species is native to Iran, North Caucasus, Transcaucasus and Turkey.

Etymlogy 
The specific name brunnescens came from 'brunne' and 'scens', together in english mean 'brownish'.

Habitat 
Festuca brunnescens is perennial and mainly grows in temperate biomes.

References 

brunnescens